Ernesto Torregrossa Rezzonico (born 28 June 1992) is a professional footballer who plays as a forward for  club Pisa. Born in Italy, he represents the Venezuela national team.

Personal life
Torregrossa was born to Venezuelan former footballer Lirio Torregrossa and Argentine former volleyball player Karina Rezzonico, both of them being of Italian descent.

Club career
On 12 January 2021, he joined Serie A club Sampdoria. Initially the transfer was a loan, at the end of which Sampdoria was obligated to purchase his rights. He signed a contract with the club that will run until 30 June 2025.

On 24 January 2022, he moved to Serie B club Pisa on loan with an option to buy and a conditional obligation to buy. On 28 July 2022, Torregrossa returned to Pisa on a new loan with an obligation to buy. On 31 January 2023, Pisa made the transfer permanent.

International career
Due to his family heritage, Torregrossa was eligible to represent Italy, Argentina or Venezuela. By May 2022, he chose the latter. In November 2022 he received his first call for "La Vinotinto".

International goals

References

External links

1992 births
Living people
Venezuelan footballers
Venezuela international footballers
Venezuelan people of Argentine descent
Sportspeople of Argentine descent
Venezuelan people of Italian descent
Sportspeople of Italian descent
People from Caltanissetta
Footballers from Sicily
Association football forwards
Italian footballers
Hellas Verona F.C. players
U.S. Siracusa players
A.C. Monza players
Como 1907 players
F.C. Lumezzane V.G.Z. A.S.D. players
F.C. Crotone players
Trapani Calcio players
Brescia Calcio players
U.C. Sampdoria players
Pisa S.C. players
Serie A players
Serie B players
Serie C players
Italian people of Venezuelan descent
Sportspeople of Venezuelan descent
Italian sportspeople of Argentine descent
Sportspeople from the Province of Caltanissetta